Walmisley is a surname, and may refer to:

Gilbert Walmisley (1680–1751), English barrister
John Walmisley
Thomas Attwood Walmisley (1814–1856), English organist and composer, son of Thomas Forbes Walmisley
Thomas Forbes Walmisley (1783–1866), English organist and composer